Shershah Engineering College Sasaram (SEC) is a government engineering college managed by the Department of Science and Technology, Bihar. It is approved and recognized by AICTE and is affiliated with Aryabhatta Knowledge University in Patna.

Departments 
SCE offers undergraduate courses in four streams of engineering:

Admission 
From 2019 onwards admissions are taken by national level exam JEE(Mains) merit list. Students desirous to take admission must appear in IIT-JEE (mains) exam that is conducted by National Testing Agency (NTA).

Earlier admissions were taken by the BCECE exam conducted by BCECE BOARD, the Bihar government.

The Bihar Combined Entrance Competitive Examination Board conducts a two-stage entrance test followed by counseling. In the first stage, candidates are screened according to their educational qualifications related to the ISC or relevant exams, after which candidates attempt to write papers in their particular subjects of interest.

A qualifying cutoff mark based on category and subject group is calculated for each candidate, with successful candidates undertaking the BCECE second stage examination. Based on the Merit List of the second stage, successful candidates then have to go through a counseling stage.

A B.Sc. degree/diploma in engineering is necessary for lateral entry in the second year and should be on the Merit list of BCECE(LE). Diploma students are more preferred over B.Sc. students in BCECE Lateral Entry Exam. Campus facilities

The campus is situated at near Badki Kharari, Sasaram. State Highway (also known as the sasaram - Karahgar highway locality) on the outskirts of Rohtas district,  from the main town, Sasaram.

Library 
Sershah Engineering College Sasaram maintains a library.

See also
 List of institutions of higher education in Bihar
 Education in Bihar
 Education in India

References

External links
 BCECE Board website
 Aryabhatta Knowledge University website
 DST, Bihar website

Engineering colleges in Bihar
Educational institutions established in 2016
Rohtas district
Dehri
Colleges affiliated to Aryabhatta Knowledge University
2016 establishments in Bihar